Op zoek naar Maria (Looking for Maria) is a talent competition program that aired in Belgium on VTM. It premiered on 25 March 2009.
The premise of the series was to find a musical theatre performer to play the role of Maria von Trapp in the 2009  and Roel Vente revival of The Sound of Music at the Efteling Theatre. The show is hosted by Koen Wauters and featured , Linda Lepomme, and Peter de Smet as the judges for the show.

Following a public telephone vote, 27-year-old  was chosen as Maria with 25-year-old Fleur Brusselmans as the runner up and Liv Van Aelst in third place.

A commercial advertising the show, featuring over 200 dancers in it, seemingly spontaneously, to "Do-Re-Mi" in Antwerpen-Centraal railway station, has received over 20,000,000 hits on YouTube.

A similar format of Op zoek naar Maria has been used as well in The Netherlands in 2021 taking an unknown singer and placing the winner in the lead role of Maria for the 2021 performances in The Netherlands. The show is hosted by Frits Sissing and featured Pia Douwes, Jamai Loman, Carline Brouwer and Richard Groenendijk as the judges for the show. It was the fifth Dutch talent show to be produced by AVRO, 10 years after Op zoek naar Evita, Op zoek naar Joseph, Op zoek naar Mary Poppins, Op zoek naar Zorro and Op zoek naar Annie. In the final, on 4 April, Nandi Van Beurden was announced as the winner of the series. This was followed by Op zoek naar Danny & Sandy in late 2022, which was won by Tristan van der Lingen and Danique Graanoogst.

A similar format has been used as well in the United Kingdom in 2006, with the show How Do You Solve a Problem like Maria? taking an unknown singer and placing the winner in the lead role for the 2006 performances in the West End. On 16 September 2006, Connie Fisher was announced the winner of this show.

Belgium

Finalists
Eleven contestants made it through the audition rounds and performed during the live shows.

* at the start of the contest

Results summary

Live shows
The live shows saw the finalists eliminated one by one following both individual and group performances. Once eliminated, the leaving contestant ended the program by leading a performance of "Adieu, vaarwel (So Long, Farewell)" from The Sound of Music with the remaining contestants.

Week 1 (April 8, 2009)
Following the first week of the competition, Dorien was the first Maria to be eliminated from the competition. The show performances were:

Group performances:
"How Do You Solve A Problem Like Maria?" (from the musical The Sound of Music)
"Don't Stop Me Now" (Queen)

Sing-off:
Dorien Ackx and Elisabeth Herman were in the sing-off, and performed "One of Us" from the musical Mamma Mia.
Albert Verlinde chose to save Elisabeth and bid farewell to Dorien.

Week 2 (April 15, 2009)
The show performances were:

Group performances:
"How Do You Solve A Problem Like Maria?" (from the musical The Sound of Music)
"Sisters Are Doin' It for Themselves" (Eurythmics & Aretha Franklin)

Sing-off:
Deborah De Ridder and Helen Geets were in the sing-off, and performed "I Know Him So Well" from the musical Chess.
Albert Verlinde chose to save Deborah and bid farewell to Helen.

Week 3 (April 22, 2009)
The show performances were:

Group performances:
"My Favorite Things" (from the musical The Sound of Music)
"Get the Party Started" (Pink)

Sing-off:
Sandra Paelinck and Ellen Vandervieren were in the sing-off, and performed "Take That Look Off Your Face" from the musical Tell Me on a Sunday.
Albert Verlinde chose to save Sandra and bid farewell to Ellen.

Week 4 (April 29, 2009)
The show performances were:

Group performances:
"The Sound of Music" (from the musical The Sound of Music)
"Dreamgirls" (from the musical Dreamgirls)

Sing-off:
Elisabeth Herman and Sandra Paelinck were in the sing-off, and performed "For Once in My Life" by Stevie Wonder.
Albert Verlinde chose to save Elisabeth and bid farewell to Sandra.

Week 5 (May 6, 2009)
The show performances were:

Group performances:
"The Lonely Goatherd" (from the musical The Sound of Music)
"Ain't No Mountain High Enough" (Marvin Gaye & Tammi Terrell)

Sing-off:
Due to Marian van Klaveren's withdrawal, there was no sing-off that week.

Week 6 (May 13, 2009)
The show performances were:

Group performances:
"I Have Confidence" (from the musical The Sound of Music)
"Do-Re-Mi" (from the musical The Sound of Music) featuring the children, who will play as the Von Trapp children in the upcoming Flemish revival of The Sound of Music
"Cell Block Tango" (from the musical Chicago)

Sing-off:
Elisabeth Herman and Liv van Aelst were in the sing-off, and performed "De roos" by Ann Christy.
Albert Verlinde chose to save Liv and bid farewell to Elisabeth.

Week 7 (May 20, 2009)
In the quarter-final, the seventh Maria to be eliminated was Elke. The show performances were:

Group performances:
"Dingen waar ik zoveel van hou" (from the musical The Sound of Music)
"Don't Rain on My Parade" (from the musical Funny Girl)

Sing-off:
Elke Buyle and Liv van Aelst were in the sing-off, and performed "The Winner Takes It All" from the musical Mamma Mia.
Albert Verlinde chose to save Liv and bid farewell to Elke.

Week 8 (May 27, 2009)
In the semi-final, the eighth and final Maria to be eliminated was Katrien. The show performances were:

Group performances:
"De boer en de boerin" (from the musical The Sound of Music)
"Aquarius/Let the Sunshine In" (from the musical Hair)

Sing-off:
Fleur Brusselmans and Katrien Smets were in the sing-off, and performed "Let It Be " by The Beatles.
Albert Verlinde chose to save Fleur and bid farewell to Katrien.

Week 9 (June 3, 2009)
The show performances were:

Group performances:
Finalists and former Marias: "Kunnen we iets beginnen met Maria (How Do You Solve a Problem Like Maria?)" (from the musical The Sound of Music)
Deborah and Fleur: "Ik kan heel de wereld aan (I Have Confidence)" (from the musical The Sound of Music)

 
After being announced as the season winner, Deborah concluded the season with a performance of "De muziek van de hoogste bergen (The Sound of Music)".

Netherlands

Expert panel
An expert panel provided advice to the contestants throughout the series, and provided comments during the live shows. The panel was made up of:
 Pia Douwes, (head judge and musical theatre actress who is very successful in Europe)
 Jamai Loman, (actor and singer)
 Carline Brouwer, (worldwide musical assistant director)
 Richard Groenendijk, (comedian, actor, presenter and lyricist)

Finalists

Live shows
The live shows saw the finalists eliminated one by one following both individual and group performances. Once eliminated, the leaving contestant ended the programme by leading a performance of "Bergen of Dalen" (Climb Every Mountain) from The Sound of Music with the remaining contestants, Unlike the Flemish version of Op zoek naar Maria and the British and Canadian versions of How Do You Solve A Problem Like Maria, which their elimination song was "So Long, Farewell" (Tot snel, vaarwel) from The Sound of Music. After being announced as the winner, Nandi concluded the show with a performance of "Iets Waar Ik Zielsveel Van Hou" (My Favorite Things).

Jury's favourite Maria

(*) Carline and Pia couldn't make a choice

Elimination chart

Performances
Nandi Van Beurden
 Week 1 - Leven is cabaret (Cabaret)
 Week 2 - Colors of the Wind
 Week 3 - It's Oh So Quiet
 Week 4 - Singin' In The Rain
 Week 5 - Just Give Me a Reason
 Week 6 Song 1 - This Is My Life
 Week 6 Song 2 - Stille liefde
 Week 7 (Final) Song 1 - All That Matters
 Week 7 (Final) Song 2 - Ergens in de sterren (Written in the Stars) (Duet with William Spaaij)
 Week 7 (Final) Song 3 - De muziek van de hoogste bergen (The Sound of Music)
 Week 7 (Final) Song 4 (Winner's song) - Iets Waar Ik Zielsveel Van Hou (My Favorite Things)

Natascha Molly
 Week 1 - Something's Got a Hold on Me
 Week 2 - Make You Feel My Love
 Week 3 - Don't Rain On My Parade
 Week 4 - Denk Aan Mij (Think Of Me)
 Week 5 - River Deep, Mountain High
 Week 6 Song 1 - Heel alleen (On My Own)
 Week 6 Song 2 - Get Happy
 Week 7 (Final) Song 1 - And I Am Telling You I'm Not Going
 Week 7 (Final) Song 2 - Meer vraag ik niet van jou (All I Ask of You) (Duet with René van Kooten)
 Week 7 (Final) Song 3 - De muziek van de hoogste bergen (The Sound of Music)

Tessa Sunniva Van Tol
 Week 1 - Always Remember Us This Way
 Week 2 - Mamma Mia
 Week 3 - Huil niet voor mij Argentina (Don't Cry for Me Argentina)
 Week 4 - All Die Jazz (All That Jazz)
 Week 5 - I Feel Pretty
 Week 6 Song 1 - Heel even
 Week 6 Song 2 - Diamonds Are a Girl's Best Friend
 Week 7 (Final) Song 1 - Mijn leven is van mij (I Belong to Me)
 Week 7 (Final) Song 2 - Beauty and the Beast (Duet with Milan van Waardenburg)

Valerie Curlingford
 Week 1 - Zeg me dat het niet zo
 Week 2 - How Will I Know
 Week 3 - Roar
 Week 4 - Inspiratie
 Week 5 - One Day I'll Fly Away
 Week 6 Song 1 - Tamelijk Voortreffelijk (Practically Perfect)
 Week 6 Song 2 - Your Song

Jolijn Henneman
 Week 1 - Arcade
 Week 2 - Hit The Road Jack
 Week 3 - Kom terug en dans met mij (I Could Have Danced All Night)
 Week 4 - Jolene
 Week 5 - Non, je ne regrette rien
 Week 6 Song 1 - Walking on Sunshine
 Week 6 Song 2 - Dit keer (Maybe This Time)

Anouk Van Laake
 Week 1 - Popular
 Week 2 - Omarm
 Week 3 - Let's Hear It for the Boy
 Week 4 - Somewhere
 Week 5 - Het dorp

Renée De Gruijl
 Week 1 - Somebody to Love
 Week 2 - Hopelessly Devoted To You
 Week 3 - Geef mij nu je angst
 Week 4 - Zeur Niet

Sanne Den Besten
 Week 1 - The Lady Is a Tramp
 Week 2 - Door De Wind
 Week 3 - Somewhere Over the Rainbow

Willemijn Maandag
 Week 1 - Don't You Worry 'bout a Thing
 Week 2 - Baby One More Time

Sylvia Boone
 Week 1 - Duurt Te Lang

Opening songs
 Week 1 - Medley (7 Rings/I Hope I Get It/Dream Girls/Maria/Ave Maria)
 Week 2 - You Can't Hurry Love
 Week 3 - One Night Only
 Week 4 - This Is Me
 Week 5 - A Brand New Day
 Week 6 - Fame
 Week 7 (Final) - The Greatest Show

Group songs
 Week 1 - I'm Still Standing
 Week 2 - The Edge of Glory
 Week 3 - Shake It Off
 Week 4 - Moves like Jagger
 Week 5 - New York, New York
 Week 6 - There's No Business Like Show Business
 Week 7 (Final) 1 - I Will Follow Him
 Week 7 (Final) 2 - Nandi & Natascha - De muziek van de hoogste bergen (The Sound of Music)

Group of 3 people songs (Week 5 only)
Nandi, Natascha & Valerie - Love Me Just A Little Bit More
Tessa, Jolijn & Anouk - Candyman

Sing-offs
 Week 1 - Sylvia & Willemijn - Hallelujah
 Week 2 - Willemijn & Anouk - Laat Me
 Week 3 - Sanne & Tessa - Zonder jou
 Week 4 - Valerie & Renée - I Know Him So Well
 Week 5 - Anouk & Valerie - Avond
 Week 6 - Valerie, Jolijn & Tessa - Nog één kans
The Bottom 2 or 3 Marias voted by the public each week had to sing a contrasting song, then Pia Douwes would choose one of them to carry on in the competition.

References

External links
  (Flemish 2009)
  (Dutch 2021)

2009 Belgian television series debuts
2009 Belgian television series endings
2021 Dutch television series debuts
2021 television series endings
2000s TV shows in the Netherlands
Belgian music television shows
Flemish television shows
Singing talent shows
Dutch reality television series
VTM (TV channel) original programming
NPO 1 original programming